Jacutinga is a municipality in the state of Minas Gerais in Brazil.  As of 2020, the estimated population was 26,264.

Other uses 
Jacutinga is also a type of gold-bearing iron ore found in Brazil.

References

External links
Prefeitura Municipal de Jacutinga

Municipalities in Minas Gerais